Our Lady of Mercy with Saints and Angels is a tempera on wood painting by Luca Signorelli, created c. 1490, showing Our Lady of Mercy flanked by Saint Sebastian and Bernardino of Siena. It is now in the Diocesan Museum in Pienza.

References

1490 paintings
Signorelli
Signorelli
Angels in art
Paintings by Luca Signorelli